Vassnebba or Grånebba is a mountain on the border of the municipalities of Sunndal and Surnadal in Møre og Romsdal county, Norway. It lies on the western border of the Trollheimen mountain range, just southwest of the Todalsfjorden and the village of Todalsøra and southeast of the village of Ålvund. The mountain is easily accessed from both sides, summer and winter.

Name
The mountain has two different names.  People from Todalsøra, in the valley to the east of the mountain, call it Vassnebba, while people on the western side, Ålvundeid, use the name Grånebba.

References

Mountains of Møre og Romsdal
Sunndal
Surnadal